Nemanja Lazić (born 10 April 1990) is a Serbian football midfielder who plays for FK Radnički Zrenjanin.

Career
In the summer 2019, Lazić joined FK Radnički Zrenjanin. He then returned to Sloboda Užice in January 2020.

References

External links
 
 

1990 births
Living people
Sportspeople from Užice
FK Hajduk Beograd players
FK BASK players
FK Železnik players
FK Sloboda Užice players
OFK Žarkovo players
FK Senta players
FK Bačka 1901 players
FK Radnički Nova Pazova players
FK Inđija players
Association football defenders
Serbian footballers